The Blacourt Formation is a geologic formation in France. It preserves fossils dating back to the Devonian period.

Paleofauna

Invertebrates
Quasillites
Rothpletzella
Tentaculites

Vertebrates
Melanodus loonesi 
Pokorninella bricae
cf. Synthetodus

See also

 List of fossiliferous stratigraphic units in France

References

 

Devonian France
Devonian southern paleotemperate deposits